, also romanized as Risa Itou, is a Japanese manga artist.

She was born in 1969 in Hara Town, Suwa District in Nagano Prefecture, the eldest of three sisters. She graduated from Suwa Futaba High School and studied Formative Fine Arts at Joshibi University of Art and Design Junior College. She won the 2005 Kodansha Manga Award for shōjo for Oi Pītan!! and the 2006 Tezuka Osamu Cultural Prize Short Story Award for One Woman, Two Cats, Oi Piitan!!, and Onna no Mado. Her manga Oruchuban Ebichu ("Ebichu Minds the House") was adapted by Gainax into an anime television series. Her latest work, Higepiyo (ヒゲぴよ), serialized in Chorus magazine, was also adapted into an anime.

Works
Hey Pitan!
One Woman, Two Cats
Onna no Mado
Oruchuban Ebichu
Otonaninatta joshi tachie(オトナになった女子たちへ)
Okāsan no tobira
Higepiyo
Hiromi and Juliet
paradise of Devils(悪魔の楽園)
On'nano mado(おんなの窓 The Woman's window)
Myorei one isan michi(おかあさんの扉)
Oikurotan(おいクロタン)
Jiehun nibang(結婚泥棒)
Kyomoyi tenki(今日もいい天気)
Binetsuna banana(微熱なバナナ)
Kofukuno susume(幸福のススメ)
Sakadachi yurei(逆立ち幽霊 The Standing ghost)
Momochin'''(モモちん)Fissatsu! OL hikotohito(必殺!OL非事人)MikkusurisaYatchimatta yo ikkodate!!''

Laureates 
 10th Tezuka Osamu Cultural Prize (2006)

References

External links 

 Official Web Site 
 
 Profile at The Ultimate Manga Page

1969 births
Living people
Women manga artists
Winner of Kodansha Manga Award (Shōjo)
Japanese female comics artists
Female comics writers
Manga artists from Nagano Prefecture
Winner of Tezuka Osamu Cultural Prize (Short Story Award)
Japanese women writers